Mary Helen Ponce is a chicana writer. She was born on January 24, 1938, in Pacoima, California.  She has worked as an instructor of Chicano studies at California State University, Northridge from 1982 to 1987 and from 1987 to 1988 she was also an adjunct professor.  From 1988 to 1992 she was adjunct faculty in the Women's Studies Program at the University of New Mexico, Women's Studies Program.  She was an adjunct faculty member at University of California from 1992 to 1993. She is also a writer for the Los Angeles Times. She earned her bachelor's degree in Anthropology from California State University in 1978 and then a master's degree in Chicano Studies in 1980.  She studied from 1982 to 1984 at the University of California at Los Angeles. There she was the recipient of the History Department's Danforth Fellowship.  She worked toward her Ph.D. at the University of New Mexico in 1988.  She is a member of Comisión Femenil San Fernando Valley.

Works 
 Taking Control, 1987, Arte Publico Press, 
 The Wedding, 1989, rev. ed., 2008, Arte Publico Press, 
 The Lives and Works of Five New Mexican Women Writers, 1936–1990 (monograph), 1992
 Hoyt Street: An Autobiography, 1993, University of New Mexico Press, 
 Calle Hoyt: Recuerdos de una Juventud Chicana, 1995, Anchor Press,

References 

1938 births
Living people
American women novelists
Hispanic and Latino American novelists
Writers from Los Angeles
California State University, Northridge alumni
California State University, Northridge faculty
University of New Mexico faculty
University of California faculty
People from Pacoima, Los Angeles
University of New Mexico alumni
University of California, Los Angeles alumni
20th-century American novelists
20th-century American women writers
American women academics